Dwarka is a village in the Badhra tehsil of the Charkhi Dadri District in the Indian state of Haryana.

References

Villages in Bhiwani district